Clemens Fritz (born 7 December 1980) is a German former professional footballer who played as a right-back and as a defensive midfielder. He is mostly known for his 11-year spell at Werder Bremen.

Having begun his career at Rot-Weiß Erfurt and Karlsruher SC, he joined Bayer Leverkusen in 2003, playing sparingly across his three seasons at the Bundesliga club. In 2006, he moved to Werder Bremen, winning the DFB-Pokal and helping them to the UEFA Cup final in 2009. Across all competitions, he has played over 300 matches for Bremen.

In a two-year international career for Germany starting in 2006, he earned 22 caps and scored two goals. He was part of their team which finished as runners-up at UEFA Euro 2008.

He announced his retirement at the end of the 2016–17 season.

Club career

Rot-Weiß Erfurt
Born in Erfurt, then in East Germany, Fritz started his footballing career playing for hometown club Rot-Weiß Erfurt in the Regionalliga.

Karlsruher SC
In the summer of 2001, he joined 2. Bundesliga club Karlsruher SC and scored five goals in 32 games. When he was signed by Bayer Leverkusen in 2003, he was loaned back to Karlsruhe to play first team football.

Bayer Leverkusen
He became part of Leverkusen's first team in the 2003–04 season second half after showing his capabilities for their reserve team. Fritz played 14 more first team games for Leverkusen that season, gaining them a UEFA Champions League place. In 2004, he broke his leg during a pre-season game against Rot-Weiss Essen, ruling him out the entire season.

Werder Bremen
In 2006, Fritz joined Werder Bremen on a free transfer, signing a three-year contract.

He announced his retirement at the end of the 2015–16 season on 14 January 2016, but signed a new one-year contract on 28 April 2016.

On 4 March 2017, in a match against Darmstadt 98, he suffered an ankle injury and underwent surgery, which ruled him out for the rest of the 2016–17 season. On 8 May 2017, he announced the end of his playing career.

International career
Having played for the Germany U-18s and U-21s, Fritz debuted with the senior team on 7 October 2006, playing the entirety of a 2–0 friendly win over Georgia at the Ostseestadion in Rostock.

On 2 June of the following year, he scored his first international goal, concluding a 6–0 rout of minnows San Marino in UEFA Euro 2008 qualifying in Nuremberg, eight minutes after entering as a substitute. He added a second on 17 November, opening a 4–0 win over Cyprus in another qualifier in Hannover by heading in Lukas Podolski's cross after two minutes.

Fritz was selected in the 23-man squad for the European Championship in Austria and Switzerland in 2008. He played in the first four of their six games as they reached the final before defeat to Spain.

Career statistics

Club

International

Scores and results list Germany's goal tally first, score column indicates score after each Fritz goal.

Honours
Werder Bremen
Bundesliga runner-up: 2007–08
DFL-Ligapokal: 2006
DFB-Pokal: 2008–09; runner-up 2009–10
UEFA Cup: runner-up 2008–09

Germany U16

 UEFA European Under-16 Championship third place: 1997

Germany
UEFA European Football Championship runner-up: 2008

References

External links

 
 
 
 Leverkusen who's who

Living people
1980 births
Sportspeople from Erfurt
Association football wingers
Association football fullbacks
UEFA Euro 2008 players
German footballers
Germany international footballers
Germany under-21 international footballers
Germany B international footballers
Bundesliga players
2. Bundesliga players
Regionalliga players
FC Rot-Weiß Erfurt players
Karlsruher SC players
Bayer 04 Leverkusen players
SV Werder Bremen players
Footballers from Thuringia